Old Coast Road may refer to:

 Forrest Highway, in Western Australia
 Old Coast Road (Big Sur), in Big Sur, California, United States